"Revenge and Remorse (The Guilty Alibi)" is the fourth episode of the TV series Police Squad!. It was directed by Paul Krasny, written by Nancy Steen and Neil Thompson, and produced by Robert K. Weiss.

Plot
The episode starts in a courthouse at night. A person (of whom only his feet are visible) enters. He moves up to room 112, the room of Judge J. Oliver Maxwell. He replaces the normal gavel with a different gavel. When Maxwell uses it the next day, at a hearing, it explodes, killing the judge.

Lieutenant Frank Drebin drives to the headquarters. After both have decided what to have for lunch, his boss, Captain Ed Hocken, also tells Frank that seven recently released criminals were sent to prison by Judge Maxwell, making this a possible revenge killing. One of them is Eddie Casales, a bomber who was arrested seven years ago. Ed and Frank decide to pay Eddie's ex-wife, Lana Casales, a visit. Lana has not spoken to her husband since the two divorced, but says that he hangs around Club Flamingo a lot, with a chorus girl named Mimi Du Jour.

That evening, Frank and Ed go to Club Flamingo to ask Du Jour some questions. She tells them that last night, during the courthouse bombing, Eddie was with her, at the movies to see On The Waterfront. While questioning Mimi, Eddie walks in, his alibi does not agree with Mimi's, and Frank and Ed eventually leave. The next afternoon, Drebin goes to the lab to see what Ted Olson has come up with. Olson says that the bomb that was used to bomb the courthouse was made from seven common household chemicals, which means that anyone with a high school knowledge of chemistry could have made the bomb, ruling out the work of a professional. Also there, Frank displays some restlessness, so Ted gives him some decaffeinated coffee, one of his new inventions. The same person who placed the gavel-bomb at the courthouse is then seen setting a bomb in a car. The next morning a man in a black suit steps into the car and, as soon as the ignition is started, his car explodes.

Act II: Richard III

When Drebin arrives at the scene of the exploded car, Hocken and Officer Norberg are already there. The victim's name was John Symington, a trial lawyer who used to be an assistant district attorney, having prosecuted Casales. His body was not found in the early investigations, but an unattentive Hocken consults his dangling arm and watch as the remainder of the corpse hangs from a tree.

Just when they are about to leave they find a matchbox from Club Flamingo, and so they leave to talk with Eddie. When Drebin arrives home, he receives a phone call from Du Jour, the two meet at Club Flamingo, and she confesses that Casales' alibi was false, but does not know where he went instead. She also mentions that Eddie left Lana, and not vice versa, and Frank has an idea.

Back at headquarters, Drebin calls Lana Casales and asks her if she needs protection, which she rejects as she is leaving town that night. Drebin also mentions those services were also offered to Du Jour, and she also rejected. Later that night, Frank and Ed are outside Mimi's house waiting, and the same pair of black shoes that placed the first two bombs once again can be seen. However, the bomber is noticed by the pair, and it turns out to be Lana Casales. An explosion attempt proves to be unsuccessful, as the bomb had already been dismantled by Eddie. Lana is then (literally) run into prison.

Epilogue
At the end of the episode, Ed asks Frank what Eddie really did instead going to the movies. Apparently, he was in Milwaukee watching a baseball game but did not want to tell anyone about it, due to parole violation issues. Both men decide to let the case rest.

Recurring jokes
Tonight's special guest star: William Shatner. As the opening credits roll, Shatner is seen seated at a restaurant table when machine gun fire suddenly begins to riddle the area around him. Shatner pulls out a gun and fires back, killing his attacker, and surviving the shooting. He then sips some wine but begins gagging and choking, and collapses while pointing to his dining companion.
Next week's experiment: "...I'll show you why women can't play professional football."
Johnny's next customer: Dr. Joyce Brothers, asking about the Cinderella Complex.
Freeze frame gag: Nordberg comes in to ask Ed about some files, then noticing the freeze frame, tries to find a good pose.

Cultural references
This is the second Police Squad! episode to refer to On the Waterfront, after Ring of Fear (A Dangerous Assignment).

References

External links
 

Police Squad! episodes
1982 American television episodes